Assawoman Bay, once called Assawoman Sound, is a lagoon that is located between Ocean City, Maryland and mainland Delmarva. The bay is located on the northern end of the city, the bay on the southern end is called the Isle of Wight Bay. Another bay called Little Assawoman Bay extends into southern Delaware, and is geologically separated from the main estuaries, by a narrow strait locally referred to as "The Ditch" which crosses the Transpeninsular Line. The larger bay is sometimes called "Big Assawoman Bay", to distinguish it from the smaller bay, though this is often meant to be a tongue-in-cheek rendering of the name.

External links
Assawoman Bay watershed profile, delawarewatersheds.org

Bays of Delaware
Bays of Maryland
Bodies of water in Sussex County, Delaware
Bodies of water of Worcester County, Maryland
Lagoons of the United States